Henry Augustus Johnson was a justice of the peace, sheriff, and state legislator in Arkansas. He represented Chicot County in the Arkansas House of Representatives in 1891. He was included in a photo montage and series of profiles of African American state legislators serving in Arkansas in 1891 published in The Freeman newspaper in Indianapolis. Several were African American.

Johnson was born in North Carolina and enslaved. He grew up in Columbus, Mississippi. As a legislator, he voted against a poll tax.

A park in Lake Village, Arkansas was dedicated in his honor in 2008.

See also
African-American officeholders during and following the Reconstruction era

References

19th-century American politicians
Year of birth missing
Year of death missing
African-American state legislators in Arkansas
Members of the Arkansas House of Representatives